Unox is a food brand of Unilever that is available in the Netherlands, Belgium and Germany. The brand is used for various meat products, such as rookworst (smoked sausage), but also for soups and noodles.

Unox marketing manager Florens Tegelaar said: "Since 1937, Unox has brought winter products, predominantly meat, and since 1957 also soups. These hearty foods are typically Dutch and consistently communicate winter. As soon as it gets cold, we are there."

The annual New Year's Dive (Nieuwjaarsduik) in Scheveningen is sponsored by Unox, where they hand out orange knit caps and pea soup (snert).

In 2018, Unilever sold the Unox factory in Oss to Zwanenberg Food Group but retained the brand Unox.

References

External links 

  

Unilever brands
Dutch brands